Twenty is a 2015 South Korean coming-of-age film starring Kim Woo-bin, Lee Jun-ho, and Kang Ha-neul. It was written and directed by Lee Byeong-heon, his second feature after the 2012 indie Cheer Up, Mr. Lee.

Plot
Chi-ho, Kyung-jae and Dong-woo are best friends who've just graduated from high school and turned 20. Chi-ho is an unemployed player living in the moment and whose number one priority is dating and chasing women. Kyung-jae is a goody-two-shoes university student whose goal is to get accepted at a corporate job; he's extremely shy around girls, but completely transforms when he gets drunk. And happy-go-lucky Dong-woo dreams of becoming a cartoonist, but when his family goes bankrupt, he's forced to become the breadwinner and take on several part-time jobs.

Cast

Kim Woo-bin as Chi-ho
Lee Jun-ho as Dong-woo
Kang Ha-neul as Kyung-jae
Jung So-min as So-min
Jung Joo-yeon as Eun-hye
Min Hyo-rin as Jin-joo
Han Joon-woo as Club DJ
Lee Yu-bi as So-hee
Kim Eui-sung as Chi-ho's father
Yang Hyun-min as So-joong
Choi Chamsarang as Sa-rang
Ahn Jae-hong as In-gook
Na Jong-chan as Dong-won
Baek Soo-hee as Min-jung
Song Ye-dam/Song Ye-joon as Twins
Han Joon-woo as Club DJ
Heo Joon-seok as Beom-soo
Jung Yeo-jin as Beom-soo's wife
Kim Jong-soo as Dong-woo's uncle
Cha Min-ji as 20 year old woman
Hong Wan-pyo as Assistant director
Oh Ha-nee as Make-up team
Kim Chan-hyeong as Head
So Hee-jung as Kyung-jae's mother
Park Myung-shin as Chi-ho's mother
Park Hyuk-kwon as Film director (cameo)
Oh Hyun-kyung as Dong-woo's mother (cameo)
Kim Jae-man as Chicken house boss (cameo)
Choi Il-gu as News anchor (cameo)

Music
Two singles were released as the film's "special" soundtrack. Part 1 (released on March 6, 2015) featured a duet by Lee Junho and Lee Yu-bi titled "Cupid's Arrow," and Part 2 (released on March 18, 2015) featured "Twenty" sung by boyband Sweet Sorrow with narration by Kim Woo-bin.

Release

South Korea
Twenty was released in South Korea on March 25, 2015. It topped the box office in its opening weekend, drawing 1,136,866 viewers and earning . As of April 19, 2015, it has grossed  with nearly 3 million admissions.

International
The film was released by CJ Entertainment America in 25 theaters across North America on April 17, 2015.

It received a theatrical release in other Asian countries such as Japan, Taiwan, Hong Kong, Singapore, Malaysia, and Vietnam.

Awards and nominations

References

External links

South Korean coming-of-age films
Next Entertainment World films
2010s Korean-language films
2010s coming-of-age films
2010s South Korean films